British Diplomacy and the Armenian Question, from the 1830s to 1914 is a book by Armenian Historian and Diplomat Dr. Arman J. Kirakossian.

Non-fiction books about the Armenian genocide
2004 non-fiction books